Caroline Lind (born October 11, 1982) is an American rower, and is a two-time Olympic gold medalist. At the end of 2014 she was ranked the #1 female rower by International Rowing Federation.

Rowing career
Lind won gold in the Women's eight for the US in the 2012 Olympics and 2008 Olympics.  She has been a member of the W8+ boat in World competitions since 2006.  At the 2008 Summer Olympics in Beijing, Lind won a gold medal as a member of the women's eight team.  It was the first gold medal for the American women's eight team since 1984.  Four years later at the 2012 Summer Olympics in London, Lind again won gold as a member of the women's eight team.  She has won World Championship titles in 2006, 2007, 2009, 2011, 2013, and 2014 in the Women's eight. In 2014, Lind with her W8+ teammates from 2008 Olympics was inducted into the US Rowing Hall of Fame. In 2014, Lind was named Athlete of the Year by the New York Athletic Club. She featured in an article by the International Rowing Federation (FISA) on how the pain barrier is broken in competitive rowing.

Education and background
Lind graduated from Phillips Academy in 2002. In 2003, she became a national debutante, at The National Debutante Cotillion and Thanksgiving Ball in Washington, D.C. She graduated from Princeton University in 2006 with an A.B. in anthropology after completing a 202-page senior thesis, titled "Flow in Rowing", under the supervision of Carolyn M. Rouse. At Princeton, Lind received the C. Otto von Kienbusch Sportswoman of the Year Award, given to a Princeton senior woman of high scholastic rank who has demonstrated general proficiency in athletics and qualities of a true sportswoman, as well as the Carol P. Brown Senior Woman Award by her Princeton teammates for being a source of inspiration, dedication, and perseverance in pursuit of excellence. Lind pursued an M.B.A. with an accounting concentration at Rider University, in Lawrenceville, New Jersey, graduating in December 2010.

See also
 List of Princeton University Olympians
 Erin Cafaro
 Anna (Mickelson) Cummins
 Caryn Davies
 Susan Francia
 Anna Goodale
 Elle Logan
 Lindsay Shoop
 Mary Whipple

References

External links
 Lind Consulting
 
  Caroline Lind – National Team rower profile at USRowing
 Visualizing the Perfect Race

1982 births
Living people
Princeton University alumni
Olympic gold medalists for the United States in rowing
Rowers at the 2008 Summer Olympics
Rowers at the 2012 Summer Olympics
Sportspeople from Greensboro, North Carolina
American female rowers
Medalists at the 2012 Summer Olympics
Medalists at the 2008 Summer Olympics
World Rowing Championships medalists for the United States
21st-century American women
American debutantes